Matthew Leo (born 8 May 1992) is an Australian professional American football defensive end for the Philadelphia Eagles of the National Football League (NFL). He played college football at Iowa State and joined the Eagles as a part of the International Player Pathway Program in 2020.

Early life and education
Matt Leo was born on 8 May 1992 in Adelaide, South Australia. He was raised in Semaphore, South Australia. He played Australian rules football for St Michael's College, Adelaide in year 10. However his passion was rugby league and he played for a club in Adelaide.

He worked as a plumber before playing American football professionally. He went to college at Arizona Western College before going to Iowa State, making his debut at the age of 26. He was a medical redshirt in 2017. He had 33 tackles and 3 sacks in his college football career. He was named first-team Academic All-Big 12 in 2019.

Professional career
On 27 April 2020, Leo was allocated to the Philadelphia Eagles as part of the International Player Pathway Program. He was waived during final roster cuts on 4 September 2020, and signed to the practice squad under an international player exemption two days later. He signed a reserve/future contract with the team after the season on 4 January 2021.

Leo was selected by the Edmonton Elks in the fourth round (35th overall) of the 2021 CFL Global Draft in April 2021. On 4 May 2021, he was given an NFL roster exemption as an international player for a second season.

On August 31, 2021, Leo was waived by the Eagles and re-signed to the practice squad the next day. He signed a reserve/future contract with the Eagles on January 18, 2022.

On August 30, 2022, Leo was waived by the Eagles and signed to the practice squad the next day.

References

External links
Matt Leo Discusses His Journey from Australia to the NFL | Eagles Press Conference
From Plumbing to the NFL: The Matt Leo Story | NFL Undiscovered – Youtube
Matt Leo Talks Fulfilling His Dream of Being in the NFL | Eagles One-On-One – Youtube
Iowa State bio
Philadelphia Eagles bio

1992 births
Living people
Australian emigrants to the United States
Australian players of American football
American football defensive ends
Iowa State Cyclones football players
International Player Pathway Program participants
Philadelphia Eagles players
Arizona Western Matadors football players
Australian expatriate sportspeople in the United States
Expatriate players of American football
Australian plumbers
Sportsmen from South Australia
Sportspeople from Adelaide